The French Coptic Orthodox Church is a Coptic Orthodox jurisdiction centered in France.

History
Coptic immigration to France began as early as 1801 after the French Invasion of Egypt and there was significant immigration after the 1952 Revolution in Egypt.

The church was canonically instituted by Pope Shenouda III on 2 July 1974 as the French Coptic Orthodox Eparchy. On 18 June 1994 Pope Shenouda raised the status of the eparchy to the French Coptic Orthodox Church, a newbody.

The church was headed by Metropolitan Marcos until his death on 11 May 2008. The seat of the head of the French Coptic Orthodox Church remained vacant until the enthronement of Bishop Athanasius, a member of the Holy Synod of the Coptic Orthodox Church, to the diocese on 16 June 2013. The French-speaking Coptic community is now served by Metropolitan Athanasius.

Bishops

Primates of the French Coptic Orthodox Church 
Marcos, Metropolitan of the Holy Metropolis of Toulon and of all France, and Primate of the French Coptic Orthodox Church. (1974-2008)
Athanasius, Metropolitan of the Holy Metropolis of Toulon and of all France, and Primate of the French Coptic Orthodox Church. (2013-Present)
Diocesan Bishop of the Holy Diocese of Marseille.

Diocesan Bishops 

 Luka, Diocesan Bishop of the Holy Diocese of Geneva (Switzerland) and Southern France. (2013-Present)

Marc, Diocesan Bishop of the Holy Diocese of Paris and all Northern France. (2015-Present)

See also
Copts
Coptic diaspora
List of Coptic Orthodox Popes of Alexandria
Patriarch of Alexandria
Christianity in Africa
Coptic Orthodox Church in Europe

References

External links
The French Coptic Orthodox Church
France Copte
Coptipedia

France
Oriental Orthodoxy in France
Christian organizations established in 1974
Christian denominations established in the 20th century
Oriental Orthodox organizations established in the 20th century